First cabinet of Azerbaijan Democratic Republic governed Azerbaijan Democratic Republic (ADR) between May 28, 1918 and June 17, 1918. It was formed after proclamation of independence of Azerbaijan on May 28, 1918 and was led by Prime Minister of Azerbaijan Fatali Khan Khoyski with the following composition:

See also
Second cabinet of Azerbaijan Democratic Republic
Third cabinet of Azerbaijan Democratic Republic
Cabinets of Azerbaijan Democratic Republic (1918-1920)
Current Cabinet of Azerbaijan Republic

References

Cabinets of Azerbaijan
Government ministers of Azerbaijan
Cabinets established in 1918
Cabinets disestablished in 1918
1918 establishments in Azerbaijan
1918 disestablishments in Azerbaijan